Yair Rosenblum (January 6, 1944 – August 27, 1996) was an Israeli composer and arranger.

Music career
Rosenblum was born in Tel Aviv.  He was musical director of the Israel Defense Forces chorus in the 1960s and 1970s. He directed Israel's annual music festivals.

For the army and navy ensembles of the Israel Defense Forces, he oversaw conducting and wrote music. He is best known for such songs, including Shir LaShalom (1970). He composed songs for films and television, and worked with a number of bands and choral groups.  He wrote more than 1,000 songs, including "Ammunition Hill" (1967), "In a Red Dress," "The Beautiful Life," "Tranquility," "Hallelujah," and "With What Will I Bless Him."

Death
Rosenblum died in Holon in 1996, at the age of 52, after a two-year battle with esophageal cancer. After his death, his daughter Karen accepted the ACUM Prize for lifetime achievement on his behalf.

References

External links

1944 births
1996 deaths
Musicians from Tel Aviv
Jewish Israeli musicians
20th-century Israeli Jews
Israeli male composers
Israeli military musicians
20th-century Israeli composers
20th-century Israeli male musicians
Israeli music arrangers
Deaths from cancer in Israel
Deaths from esophageal cancer